Odobenidae is a family of pinnipeds. The only extant species is the walrus (Odobenus rosmarus). In the past, however, the group was much more diverse, and includes more than a dozen fossil genera.

Taxonomy 
All genera, except Odobenus, are extinct.
†Archaeodobenus
†Prototaria
†Proneotherium
†Nanodobenus
†Neotherium
†Imagotaria
†Kamtschatarctos
†Pelagiarctos
†Pontolis
†Pseudotaria
†Titanotaria
Clade Neodobenia
†Gomphotaria
Subfamily Dusignathinae
†Dusignathus
Subfamily Odobeninae
†Aivukus
†Ontocetus
†Pliopedia
†Protodobenus
†Valenictus
Odobenus

In re-analyzing Pelagiarctos, Boessenecker et al. (2013) proposed the phylogenetic relationships of Odobenidae as follows (this analysis excluded Archaeodobenus, Titanotaria, Nanodobenus, and Pliopedia; and included Enaliarctos, Pteronarctos, Allodesmus, Desmatophoca, Callorhinus, Monachus, and Erignathus):

References

Further reading 

 

Pinnipeds
Mammal families
Odobenids
Taxa named by Joel Asaph Allen
Extant Miocene first appearances